Ayoquesco Zapotec (Western Ejutla Zapotec, Zapoteco de Santa María Ayoquezco) is a small Zapotec language of Oaxaca, Mexico.
Ayoquesco Zapotec (Dísè) is spoken in Santa María Ayoquezco and Santa Cruz Nexila, around 50% intelligible to San Andres Zabache speakers.

References

MacLaury, Robert E. 1970. Ayoquesco Zapotec: Ethnography, phonology, and lexicon. MA thesis, University of the Americas.

Zapotec languages